The Roman Catholic Diocese of Lismore is a suffragan Latin Rite diocese of the Archdiocese of Sydney, established in 1887, initially as the Diocese of Grafton, and then changed to the current name in 1900. The diocese covers the North Coast region of New South Wales in Australia.

Ordinaries

Bishop of Grafton
The following individual has been elected as Roman Catholic Bishop of Grafton:
{| class="wikitable"
!Order
!Name
!Date installed
!Term ended
!Term of office
!Reason for term end
|-
|align="center"| ||Jeremiah Joseph Doyle ||align="center" |13 May 1887 ||align="center" |4 June 1909 ||align="right" |  ||Died in office
|-
|}

Bishops

Bishops of Lismore
The following individuals have been elected as Roman Catholic Bishop of Lismore:
{| class="wikitable"
!Order
!Name
!Date installed
!Term ended
!Term of office
!Reason for term end
|-
|align="center"| ||John Carroll ||align="center" |2 December 1909  ||align="center" |8 May 1949 ||align="right" |  ||Died in office
|-
|align="center"| ||Patrick Joseph Farrelly ||align="center" |8 May 1949 ||align="center" |1 September 1971 ||align="right" |  ||Retired and was appointed Bishop Emeritus of Lismore
|-
|align="center"| ||John Steven Satterthwaite ||align="center" |1 September 1971 ||align="center" |1 December 2001 ||align="right" |  ||Retired and was appointed Bishop Emeritus of Lismore
|-
|align="center"| ||Geoffrey Jarrett||align="center" |1 December 2001 ||align="center" |22 February 2017 ||align="right" | ||Retired and was appointed Bishop Emeritus of Lismore
|-
|align="center"| ||Greg Homeming||align="center" |22 February 2017||align="center" |present ||align="right" | ||n/a
|-
|}

Coadjutor bishops
Patrick Joseph Farrelly (1931-1949)
John Steven Satterthwaite (1969-1971)
Geoffrey Hylton Jarrett (2000-2001)

Other priests of this diocese who became bishops
Terence Bernard McGuire, appointed Bishop of Townsville in 1930
Norman Thomas Gilroy, appointed Bishop of Port Augusta in 1934; future Cardinal
Thomas Absolam McCabe, appointed Bishop of Port Augusta in 1938
Thomas William Muldoon, appointed Auxiliary Bishop of Sydney, in 1960

Cathedral
The Cathedral of St Carthage's was commissioned by Bishop Jeremiah Doyle, circa 1890. Designed in 1892 by Herbert Wardell (the son of notable AngloAustralian architect and civil engineer William Wardell), the cathedral is modelled in gothic revival style. The foundation stone was laid in 1892 and construction began in early 1904, with the sanctuary, transepts and nave completed by mid-1907 when the first liturgical mass was held. A public appeal was held to raise £2,000 for the peal of twelve bells from Dublin, that were installed in the bell tower by 1911. A large pipe organ completed the project and in 1919, with all debts dissolved, St Carthage's Cathedral received its solemn dedication by the Apostolic Delegate, Archbishop Cattaneo.

In 2007 the cathedral was seriously damaged by hail storms in the region. An appeal to restore the cathedral commenced in 2007, with initial plans to construct the spire initially designed by Wardell. However, when commissioning the works in 2009, the main focus of the project was on roof slates, stained glass windows, and lead downpipes; with completion of the stone steeple ruled out.

Other information
The Catholic Education Office which is responsible for 46 co-educational schools in the Diocese, is located in Lismore. The Aboriginal Catholic Ministry is located in Macksville. The Diocese also offers a number of health and aged care services ranging from child care to nursing homes to natural family planning services.

The Diocese also has a community of Marist Brothers, another of Presentation Sisters and a convent of Carmelite Nuns.

See also

Roman Catholicism in Australia

References

External links
Catholic Diocese of Lismore
Catholic Education Office, Diocese of Lismore

 
Lismore, Roman Catholic Diocese of
Lismore
Lismore
Lismore